The 12753 / 12754 Marathwada Sampark Kranti Express is a Superfast express train of the Sampark Kranti Express series belonging to Indian Railways – South Central Railway zone that runs between  and  in India.

Background 
It operates as train number 12753 from Hazur Sahib Nanded to Hazrat Nizamuddin and as train number 12754 in the reverse direction, serving the states of Maharashtra, Madhya Pradesh,  Uttar Pradesh and Delhi.

It is the latest train introduced in the Sampark Kranti Express series which were originally started by the then railway minister of India Mr. Nitish Kumar.

Coaches
The 12753 / 54 Hazur Sahib Nanded–Hazrat Nizamuddin Marathwada Sampark Kranti Express has one AC 2 tier, two AC 3 tier, six Sleeper class, four Unreserved/General and two Seating cum Luggage Rake Coaches. It does not carry a pantry car.

Service

Route and halts

Traction
As the route is still to be fully electrified a PUNE Shed WDP-4D loco hauls this trains from Hazur Sahib Naded to Hazrat Nizamudin.

References

External links

Sampark Kranti Express trains
Rail transport in Maharashtra
Rail transport in Uttar Pradesh
Rail transport in Madhya Pradesh
Rail transport in Delhi
Railway services introduced in 2019